Pepsis thisbe, the tarantula hawk, is a species of spider wasp in the family Pompilidae. Females are 32-44 mm long with a dark blue body and orange wings.

References

Further reading

External links

 

Pepsinae
Insects described in 1895